Cirrhophanus pretiosa is a moth of the family Noctuidae first described by Herbert Knowles Morrison in 1875. It is found in North America, including Texas, Oklahoma, and Florida.

It was considered a synonym of Cirrhophanus triangulifer for some time, but was elevated from synonymy by Robert W. Poole in 1995.

References

Stiriinae
Moths described in 1875